The CSM/Pré-Fabricar/FME/Jaraguá (formerly known as Associação Desportiva Jaraguá and Malwee Futsal) is a Brazilian futsal club from Jaraguá do Sul, Santa Catarina. Founded  on February 15, 1992, it is one of the most successful clubs of the sport in Brazil.

History
The club was founded on February 15, 1992, as Associação Desportiva Jaraguá. Until 2000, Jaraguá did not participate in the Liga Futsal. Since 2001 the club has been sponsored by Malwee Malhas. In 2005, the club won the Liga Futsal. Malwee/Jaraguá won the Taça Brasil de Futsal five times in a row (from 2003 to 2007). In 2007, the club brought back to Brazil two Spain-based players, Lenisio and Ari. In that year, Malwee/Jaraguá won the Liga Futsal for the second  time beating its rival, Joinville 11-4 in the aggregate score.

In 2004, in 2005, in 2006 and in 2007, Malwee/Jaraguá won the South American Club Futsal Championship. The club reached the Intercontinental Futsal Cup in 2005, in 2006, 2007 and in 2008, but was defeated by Boomerang Interviú, from Spain, in all the four years.

In November 2010 the team was dissolved.

In 2012, the team returned to futsal with the name of CSM/Pré-Fabricar/FME/Jaraguá.

Titles

National
 Liga Futsal: 2005, 2007, 2008, 2010
 Taça Brasil de Futsal: 2003, 2004, 2005, 2006, 2007, 2008
 Superliga de Futsal: 2005, 2006
 Campeonato Brasileiro de Seleções: 2001
 Copa Sul: 2005
 Campeonato de Santa Catarina: 2002, 2003, 2004, 2005, 2006
 Copa Santa Catarina 2002, 2006
 Jogos Abertos de Santa Catarina: 2001, 2002, 2003
 Copa Cascavel: 2003
 Copa Fiat: 2001

International
 South American Club Futsal Championship: 2004, 2005, 2006, 2007
 International Umbro Cup: 2002

Current squad

Home arena
The club plays its home matches at Arena Jaraguá, which has a maximum capacity of 15,000 people.

Noted players
 Falcão
 Lenísio
 Tiago
 Manoel Tobias

References

External links
 Official website

Futsal clubs established in 1992
1992 establishments in Brazil
Futsal clubs in Brazil
Sports teams in Santa Catarina (state)